Neal Tivis (born November 18, 1988) is an American football offensive lineman who is currently a free agent. He played college football at Abilene Christian University and attended Sanger High School in Sanger, Texas. He has also been a member of the Utah Blaze and Beijing Lions.

College career
Tivis played for the Abilene Christian Wildcats from 2007 to 2011. He was the team's starter his final two years and helped the Wildcats to 39 wins. He played in 47 games during his career including 23 starts at tackle. Tivis was named Second Team All-Lone Star Conference as a junior and First Team All-Lone Star Conference as a senior.

College statistics

Professional career

Tivis was invited to the Dallas Cowboys rookie mini-camp as an undrafted free agent, but was not offered a contract.

Utah Blaze
On June 14, 2012, Tivis was assigned to the Utah Blaze. Tivis started the final six games of the 2012 season for the Blaze. On November 20, 2012, Tivis was assigned to the Blaze for the 2013 season. On June 13, 2013, Tivis was placed on recallable reassignment, but he was activated the next day. On July 23, 2013, Tivis' season ended when he was placed on injured reserve.

Philadelphia Soul
Tivis was assigned to the Philadelphia Soul following the Blaze's folding at the conclusion of the 2013 season. Tivis helped anchor the offensive line that lead the league in rushing during the 2014, 2015 and 2016. At the conclusion of the 2016 regular season, Tivis was named Second Team All-Arena. Tivis helped the Soul to an ArenaBowl XXIX championship. Tivis re-joined the Soul in the middle of the 2017 season on May 16, 2017. On August 26, 2017, the Soul beat the Tampa Bay Storm in ArenaBowl XXX by a score of 44–40.

Beijing Lions
Tivis was selected by the Beijing Lions of the China Arena Football League (CAFL) in the second round of the 2016 CAFL Draft. Tivis was named an All-Pro North Division All-Star and helped the Lions win the first-ever China Bowl. He is listed on the Lions' roster for the 2018 season.

References

External links
Abilene Christian Wildcats profile

Living people
1988 births
American football offensive linemen
Abilene Christian Wildcats football players
Utah Blaze players
Philadelphia Soul players
Beijing Lions players